The 1985 William & Mary Tribe football team represented the College of William & Mary as an independent during the 1985 NCAA Division I-AA football season. Led by Jimmye Laycock in his sixth year as head coach, William & Mary finished the season with a record of 7–4 and ranked No. 16 in the final NCAA Division I-AA Football Committee poll.

Schedule

References

William and Mary
William & Mary Tribe football seasons
William and Mary Indians football